Chung Hyun-back (born 9 April 1953) is a South Korean emeritus professor of history at Sungkyunkwan University previously served as President Moon Jae-in's first Minister of Gender Equality and Family.

Before entering politics in 2017, she had dedicated her career in academia and civil societies. 

Chung first joined Kyonggi University's faculty as its assistant professor in 1984. In 1986 she moved to Sungkyunkwan University department of history as its associate professor and was later promoted to its professor. 

Also, Chung was the co-head of two large NGOs in Korea, the Korean Women's Association United and People’s Solidarity for Participatory Democracy, and also led NGOs for Inter-Korean relations - Civil Peace Forum and Korean Council for Reconciliation and Cooperation.

She holds three degrees in history-related subjects - a bachelor in history education and a master's in Western history from Seoul National University and a doctorate in German history from Ruhr University Bochum.

References 

Academic staff of Sungkyunkwan University
Living people
Seoul National University alumni
Ruhr University Bochum alumni
1953 births
People from Busan
Women government ministers of South Korea
South Korean women academics
South Korean women's rights activists